The following is a list of military aircraft of Finland, both historical and currently in use by the Finnish Defence Forces.

Current inventory

Heavy Airlift Wing

Army Aviation

Helicopters
All helicopters were transferred to the army aviation in 1997.

UAVs

Post-WWII Aircraft, propeller-driven

Cold-War jet aircraft

World War II

Fighters

Bombers

Reconnaissance

Liaison

Transport

Amphibious

Trainer

Inter-war years

References

Aviation in Finland
Aircraft
Finland Military Aircraft